MeshBox is an item of computer hardware which is used to provide large scale wireless broadband networks. Manufactured by LocustWorld, the devices are designed to co-operate with other MeshBoxes within range, passing the internet service from one box to the next, over the air, until it reaches the final destination. The coverage area of a mesh is typically measured in square miles or square kilometres.

Originally released as a bootable CD-ROM called MeshAP based on the OpenAP open source software, the system is now implemented as system image which can fit within a small 32MB CompactFlash card. The system functions have expanded beyond creating wireless networks to provide set-top box services, MP3 audio and video streaming, connection to remote windows terminal servers, other PCs, web browsing, connection to peer-to-peer networks, instant messaging and file exchange.

See also
 Wireless mesh network
 Wireless LAN
 Wireless access point
 Wireless community network
 IEEE 802.11

External links
 CommunityWireless.org
 Wireless Internet Assigned Numbers Authority

Hardware routers
Linux-based devices
IEEE 802.11
Mesh networking